Abdullah Al-Hussini (born 1942) is an Omani shooter. He competed in the 1984 Summer Olympics.

References

1942 births
Living people
Shooters at the 1984 Summer Olympics
Omani male sport shooters
Olympic shooters of Oman